Kiltartan Castle is a tower house and National Monument located in County Galway, Ireland.

Location

Kiltartan Castle lies in the civil parish of Kiltartan.

History

The tower house was built in the 1280s, during the reign of Edward I as Lord of Ireland.

It was ruined in the 1650s during the Cromwellian conquest.

Description
Two storeys partially remain, with a 3-storey spiral stairway and numerous arrowslits.

References

National Monuments in County Galway
Castles in County Galway